Bernard Frank Jackson (born  August 24, 1950 – May 26, 1997) was an American football defensive back who played for three National Football League (NFL) teams. He was the 81st pick in the 1972 NFL draft, selected by the Cincinnati Bengals as a defensive back. After five years, he was traded to the Denver Broncos in March 1977, and was a starter, including Super Bowl XII.

College career
As a collegiate player at Washington State in the Pac-8, Jackson was a running back and kick returner for head coach Jim Sweeney During his senior season in 1971, he rushed for 1,189 yards on 177 attempts (6.7 avg, 1st in Pac-8) and was named First-team All-Pac-8 and All-Coast. His 2,118 all-purpose yards in 1971 -- 1,189 on the ground, 744 in kickoff returns and 185 receiving -- remains the all-time WSU single-season record. He returned two kickoffs for TDs and also scored on a fake punt that season. He is a member of the WSU Athletics Hall of Fame.

A 1968 graduate of Dorsey High School in Los Angeles, he had dreamed of playing for the USC Trojans, but was just  and began his college career at Pierce College in Los Angeles.

Professional career
After five years with the Bengals, Jackson was traded to the Denver Broncos in March 1977, and that season the Broncos won the AFC title and advanced to Super Bowl XII. Jackson started the game, but the Broncos lost to the Dallas Cowboys 27–10.

Injured with a muscle bruise for much of the 1980 season, he was waived in late November  and picked up by the San Diego Chargers.

Death
Jackson died of liver cancer at age 46 in Lompoc, California, and is buried at its Evergreen Cemetery.

References

External links

 
 

1950 births
1997 deaths
Players of American football from Washington, D.C.
Washington State Cougars football players
American football safeties
Cincinnati Bengals players
Denver Broncos players
Deaths from liver cancer
Deaths from cancer in California
Susan Miller Dorsey High School alumni